The Indonesian Protestant Church in Gorontalo is an independent church within the Protestant Church in Indonesia serving Gorontalo, North Sulawesi and Central Sulawesi. It has 98 congregations and 10,000 members. The church is a member of the World Communion of Reformed Churches.

References 

1965 establishments in Indonesia
Calvinist denominations established in the 20th century
Reformed denominations in Indonesia
Christian organizations established in 1965